The Future Cup (officially known as the ABN AMRO Future Cup, and previously known as the AEGON Future Cup) is an annual friendly international youth tournament which is organized by the Dutch football club AFC Ajax. The tournament is created for under-17 youth teams, and is held at De Toekomst, every year during the Easter weekend. The tournament has been contested by some of the strongest under-17 teams in football, with FC Barcelona, Manchester United and Bayern Munich amongst the participating clubs. The first five editions of the tournament were named after its main sponsor, the insurance company AEGON, before the Dutch state-owned bank ABN AMRO took over as the main sponsor of the event. The tournament is broadcast on television in over 59 countries via Eredivisie Live, Eurosport and Fox Sports.

Qualification
8 teams participate in the Future Cup every year. Since Ajax are the tournament hosts, they are automatically entered, leaving 7 additional places available in the tournament. Six of the spots can be filled with a simple registration of an under-17 team from any club, while national teams are also able to register, such as the China U-17 team did when it competed in the first edition of the competition. The eighth and final position is filled by the winners of the Brazilian 'Craques Mongeral AEGON Future Cup - Um Torneio do Ajax' a parallel running competition for under-17 youth teams in South America which shares the same sponsor. The winner of that tournament is automatically seeded for the Future Cup in Amsterdam the next year, completing the 8 participants in the Cup challenge.

Format
The draw takes place ahead of the last home match of the Ajax first team ahead of the Future Cup. The 8 teams are then divided up into two groups during halftime of this match. The opening ceremony of the tournament takes place on the Friday evening before Easter, while the first matches are played on Holy Saturday. The first two group stage matches are played for each team on this day, while the last two group stage matches are then contested on Easter Sunday. The finals are played on Monday, the second Easter day. The day starts with the matches for the 7th and 8th place, which are contested by the two teams who finished bottom of their groups. Afterwards the two semi-finals are played. The group winners of each group compete against the second place team of the other group, and after the two semi-finals the matches for 5th and 6th place are contested against the third place team from each group. The matches for 3rd and 4th place are then contested amongst the losers of the Semi-finals, which is concluded by the Cup final, deciding the 1st and 2nd place. The awards and trophies are awarded directly after the Final, at which all teams and coaches are present.

Finals
Statistics accurate as of ABN AMRO Future Cup 2019. 

Cancelled due to the COVID-19 pandemic in the Netherlands

Prizes
The winner of the Future Cup are obvious winners of the tournament. For this information please see the next segment below. Other prizes are however awarded in conclusion, which are handed out by prominent former and current Ajax members, with Frank de Boer, Martin Jol and Luis Suárez amongst those who have awarded the trophies. The man of the tournament is selected and awarded the adidas Best player of ABN AMRO Future Cup award. Below is a list of the prize winners over the years:

Every year the prize adidas Top Scorer of ABN AMRO Future Cup is awarded to the top-scorer of the tournament. Below is a list of the top-scorers for each year:

Statistics

Appearances and best results 
Statistics accurate as of ABN AMRO Future Cup 2019.

All-time cup winners

All-time top-scorers 
Statistics accurate as of AEGON Future Cup 2014.

Participation by country
The under-17 youth teams of the following clubs have participated in the Future Cup tournament in the past.
	

Argentina
  Boca Juniors
 2019
Australia
  Sydney FC
 2018
Austria
  Red Bull Salzburg
 2016
Belgium
  Anderlecht
 2010 , 2011, 2012, 2013, 2014, 2015, 2016, 2017, 2018, 2019, 2023
Brazil
  Corinthians
 2014
  Desportivo Brasil
 2012
  Fluminense
 2011
  São Paulo
 2013
Canada
  Toronto FC
 2013
China
  China U-17
 2010, 2011
Denmark
  Nordsjælland
 2023
England
  Arsenal
 2016, 2017
  Chelsea
 2023
  Liverpool
 2010, 2014
  Manchester United
 2012
  Tottenham Hotspur
 2013, 2019

France
  Paris Saint-Germain
 2017, 2018, 2019, 2023
Germany
  Bayern Munich
 2010, 2013, 2017, 2018
  Borussia Mönchengladbach
 2023
  Schalke 04
 2015
Ghana
  Right to Dream
 2016
Greece
  Olympiacos
 2016
Italy
  Juventus
 2015, 2017, 2018, 2019, 2023
  Milan
 2010, 2012, 2014
Japan
  J. League U-17
 2017, 2018
  Sagan Tosu
 2019
Mexico
  Pachuca
 2023
Netherlands
  Ajax
 2010, 2011, 2012, 2013, 2014, 2015, 2016, 2017, 2018, 2019, 2023

Portugal
  Benfica
 2013, 2016, 2017, 2019
  Porto
 2015
  Sporting CP
 2018
Scotland
  Celtic
 2011, 2014, 2015

South Africa
  Ajax Cape Town
 2011, 2012
Spain
  Atlético Madrid
 2019
  Barcelona
 2010, 2012, 2015, 2016
  Sevilla FC
 2018
Turkey
  Beşiktaş JK
 2012
  Fenerbahçe
 2014
  Galatasaray
 2015
United States
  D.C. United
 2011
  FC Dallas
 2010

See also 
 Amsterdam Tournament
 Copa Amsterdam

References

External links
 

AFC Ajax
Dutch football friendly trophies
Recurring sporting events established in 2010
2010 establishments in the Netherlands